Daniel Charles Anthony Ticktum (born 8 June 1999) is a British racing driver currently racing with the NIO 333 FE Team in the Formula E World Championship.

Ticktum became a member of the Red Bull Junior Team in 2017. During his time with Red Bull, Ticktum won the Macau Grand Prix in 2017 and 2018, and was runner-up in the 2018 FIA Formula 3 European Championship. In addition, Ticktum was awarded the McLaren Autosport BRDC Award in 2017 and was named Autosport National Driver of the Year in 2018.

After a brief stint in the Super Formula Championship in 2019, Ticktum left the Red Bull Junior Team. He joined the Williams Driver Academy at the end of 2019, and stayed with them until the summer of 2021.

Early career

Karting career 
Born in London, Ticktum began karting in 2007 at the age of eight and started racing in championships the following year. He enjoyed early success, winning the Bamford Kart Club Winter Series and competing in the Super 1 National Championship in the Honda Cadet class with Project One Racing in just his first year of competition. In the following two years Ticktum competed to drive in local and national championships, which culminated in winning the Buckmore Park Kart Club Winter Series in 2009 and placing second in the National Super One Championship the same year, having competed for Ambition Motorsport.

In 2011, he completed the Grand Slam of British national cadet titles — winning the British Formula Kart Stars Championship, National ABkC Super One Championship, British Open Championship and British Grand Prix Championship, beating the likes of Lando Norris, Enaam Ahmed, Jamie Caroline and Billy Monger.

A year later, Ticktum moved into the international scene, competing in the WSK Euro Series and WSK Master Series, finishing both championships as the highest placed rookie.

In 2013, Ticktum joined Ricky Flynn Motorsport, finishing second in the European Championship, tying on points with winner Lando Norris, and second in the National Super One Championship. The same year Ticktum won the KFJ Andrea Margutti Trophy against the likes of Lando Norris and Jehan Daruvala, with previous winners being F1 stars Giancarlo Fisichella, Robert Kubica and Daniil Kvyat.

The following year, Ticktum finished second in the WSK Masters to Enaam Ahmed and took part in his first test in the BRDC Formula 4 Championship with Lanan Racing, where he broke the lap record at the Brands Hatch Indy Circuit. He also finished sixth and fourth in the World and European championships respectively.

MSA Formula and two year ban 
In 2015, Ticktum graduated to MSA Formula with Fortec Motorsport. He led the early rounds of the Championship, taking two victories at Donington and one at Snetterton, but fell behind his main rivals Lando Norris and Colton Herta as the season progressed. At the penultimate round of the season at Silverstone, Ticktum got involved in an incident with Ricky Collard on the opening lap, which dropped him to the back of the field. During the ensuing safety car period he purposely overtook several cars to crash into Collard, taking both out of the race. This saw him receive a two-year ban from motorsport, of which one year was a suspended ban, as well as a disqualification from the event's results. Following the incident, Ticktum labelled himself "a fool" and apologised to his fellow drivers and the track marshals at the circuit. As a result, he finished sixth in his first season of single-seater racing and ended up second in the rookie standings, which he had originally won during the aforementioned Silverstone weekend.

Return to single-seater racing and debut at Macau 
In 2016, Ticktum returned to motorsport, competing in the final round of the FIA European Formula 3 Championship in Hockenheim with Carlin. He also took part in the BRDC British Formula 3 Autumn Trophy with Double R Racing, where he won the second race and placed fourth in the standings. Following that, Ticktum made his debut in the Macau Grand Prix with Double R Racing, finishing eighth in Saturday's qualifying race before retiring early in the main race thanks to an accident caused by a rival.

Formula Renault Eurocup

2015 
In 2015 Ticktum made a one-off appearance in the Formula Renault Eurocup with Koiranen GP, finishing 16th and eleventh in his two races at the Nürburgring.

2017 
Following Ticktum's return to competition, he went into his first full racing season in 2017, driving in the Eurocup with Arden International, who were making their category debut that year, together with Ghislain Cordeel and Zane Goddard. He also competed in the MRF Challenge in pre-season during the final round. He claimed his only win of the season at the Hungaroring, having qualified on pole during a wet-weather session, and scored two further podiums at Silverstone and the Nürburgring, finishing the season seventh in the drivers' standings. He also became the second-best rookie of the season, finishing thirty points behind Max Fewtrell. At the end of the year, Ticktum was ranked 13th of Motorsport.com's top 20 junior single-seater drivers, and also won the McLaren Autosport BRDC Award.

GP3 Series 
In September 2017, Ticktum made his debut in the GP3 Series at Monza with DAMS, partnering Tatiana Calderón and Bruno Baptista. He claimed a podium finish in his second full race weekend at the season finale in Abu Dhabi and finished eleventh in the standings, ahead of some full-time competitors, including all drivers who raced for DAMS that year.

Macau Grand Prix 
In November 2017, Ticktum competed in a one-off race at the Macau Grand Prix with Team Motopark. He qualified sixth and finished eighth in the Qualifying race, behind two of his teammates. However, Ticktum managed to overtake three of his rivals into Lisboa corner on lap 14 and claimed victory after leaders Ferdinand Habsburg and Sérgio Sette Câmara crashed in the final corner of the 15th and final lap. He would win the race again in 2018 after dominating throughout the whole weekend, topping the qualifying session, winning the qualifying race and dominating from lights to flag in the Grand Prix. Ticktum became the third driver to win the race in consecutive years. On his victory, the Brit stated that

FIA European Formula 3 Championship 
In December 2017, it was confirmed that Ticktum would contest the FIA Formula 3 European Championship with Team Motopark in 2018, alongside Sebastián Fernández, Fabio Scherer, Jonathan Aberdein, Marino Sato and Jüri Vips. Ticktum started the season in positive fashion, scoring third place in the opening race at Pau. He would better that result at the Hungaroring, where he took a lights-to-flag win in the first race and finished second to Enaam Ahmed in Race 3, though a component failure prevented a podium in Race 2. At the following round at the Norisring, Ticktum stalled at the start of the second race and was hit from behind by Ameya Vaidyanathan, which forced the Brit to go to hospital and his team to fully repair the car with just a few hours available. Thankfully for Ticktum, Motopark were able to fix his chassis and he went on to win the following race, less than a tenth ahead of teammate Vips. Ticktum later described the work his team had done as "unbelievable".

The Brit endured a difficult weekend in Zandvoort, with him being squeezed into the path of Mick Schumacher by Ralf Aron at the first corner of the second race and receiving a drive-through penalty for a false start in the third race. Spa would be better for Ticktum, as he took victory in Race 2, having started from tenth on the grid. Another win at Silverstone put Ticktum into the lead of the championship, and he remained there following the seventh event, held at Misano.

However, in the last three rounds of the championship, Schumacher scored a total of eight podiums out of nine races, with five successive wins, which put Ticktum from being 36 points ahead of the Prema driver after the Misano round to being 52 points behind by season's end. Both Ticktum and Prema's Ralf Aron suggested that there was something dubious about the form Schumacher and his teammate Robert Shwartzman were showing in the final third of the season, with the Brit describing their sudden surge in performance as "interesting".

Ticktum amassed five pole positions and a total of eight podiums, becoming the highest-placed rookie in the final year of the series. His performances also made sure that Motopark would finish second in the teams' championship. Ticktum was ranked fourth of Motorsport.com's top 20 junior single-seater drivers in 2018.

Super Formula Championship

2018 
Mid-2018 Ticktum was announced to make his debut in the Super Formula Championship with Team Mugen at Sportsland Sugo. He retired from that race, but competed in the following event at Fuji, finishing eleventh. Ticktum was classified 19th in the full standings.

2019 
Ticktum joined Team Mugen for the 2019 season, partnering Tomoki Nojiri, after an unsuccessful attempt to find a Formula 2 drive. His campaign started out with an eighth place at the Suzuka Circuit, but things would head for the worst when Ticktum stalled his car after a spin on a curb in the next round at Autopolis. The spin damaged the chassis, and, after his request to check the car on a chassis dyno was denied by Mugen, Ticktum found himself being one second behind teammate Nojiri in qualifying for the round at Sportsland Sugo. He finished the race in 15th position. Soon after, Ticktum was announced to be leaving the championship the following week when he was dropped from the Red Bull programme. He was replaced by Patricio O'Ward. Ticktum was eventually classified 20th in the standings.

Asian Winter Series 
Before the start of his 2019 Super Formula campaign, Ticktum participated in the 2019 F3 Asian Winter Series. After scoring a second place, he pulled out of the series before the final round.

2019 post-Super Formula 
After a brief hiatus from racing following his exit from the Red Bull Junior Team, during which Ticktum briefly considered quitting the sport, he would partake in a shakedown of the new Dallara 320 chassis at Varano. He then competed in two rounds of the Formula Regional European Championship for Van Amersfoort Racing, scoring a pair of second places in Barcelona, this allowed him to end ninth in the standings. In October, he partook in the FIA Formula 3 post-season test with Carlin at the Circuit Ricardo Tormo, following that he returned to the 2019 Macau Grand Prix with Carlin. He was involved in a pileup during the qualification race, but clawed his way back to 13th in the main event.

FIA Formula 2 Championship

2018 
At the start of 2018, Ticktum first tested in Formula 2 when DAMS' Nicholas Latifi had fallen ill. Following the Brit's Formula 3 campaign, he drove for Arden in the final round of the FIA Formula 2 Championship in Abu Dhabi, where he finished eleventh in his first race at that level. However, he was forced to retire from the sprint race after his car had developed a technical issue.

2020 
In December 2019, it was announced Ticktum would contest the 2020 season with reigning team champions DAMS alongside Sean Gelael. Ticktum qualified ninth during the first round in Austria and made his way up to fifth in the feature race. He would score his first podium in the sprint race, inheriting third place after an engine issue for Marcus Armstrong. An eighth place came in the feature race of the second Austria round, scoring reverse pole. He would lose the lead to Christian Lundgaard during the sprint, but would come away with a second place. He would be deprived of a podium opportunity in Budapest after a mechanical issue during the sprint race, but scored points in the feature race. Ticktum qualified 12th and finished eighth in the feature race which gave him reverse pole again. He bounced back in the sprint race where he earned his first victory in Formula 2, having held off a charging Lundgaard in the final laps. In the second Silverstone round, Ticktum qualified an impressive fourth, but dropped to 15th at the feature race end. He managed to climb to seventh in the sprint. After topping practice in Barcelona, he went on to qualify eighth. He finished both races in tenth, but scored two points in the sprint race thanks to a fastest lap.

Ticktum did not take part in Belgium practice due to an inconclusive Covid-19 test, but was cleared for qualifying. After securing sixth place in the feature race, he would collide with fellow Williams Academy member Roy Nissany battling for the lead, sending the Israeli into the barriers. In Monza, he qualified tenth and progressed to seventh in the feature race. In the sprint race, he would snatch the lead from Louis Delétraz and lead a lights-to-flag for victory. However, his win was stripped from him due to lack of fuel after crossing the line leading to him falling out of the top ten in the standings. He secured second in qualifying at Mugello, but incidents deprived him of any points. In Russia, he had a solid weekend, taking the final points positions in both races. In Bahrain, he qualified third, and his only points came in the feature race with ninth. During the second Bahrain round and finale, Ticktum claimed reverse pole in the feature race by finishing eighth. He would finish behind the Carlins clinching a third place. Ticktum finished his season eleventh in the championship, placing as the fourth-highest rookie with 96.5 points, one victory and three other podiums. He would later make an appearance at the post-season test in Bahrain for Carlin alongside his F2 rival Jehan Daruvala.

2021 

In 2021, Ticktum switched to Carlin alongside Daruvala. In the first round at the Bahrain International Circuit, Ticktum qualified fourth for Sunday's feature race. In sprint race 1 he collided with Richard Verschoor and received a five-second penalty. Despite this, he fought back to finish in eighth place. For the next race, he started from third but was forced to retire after being spun around at the first corner by Robert Shwartzman. In the feature race, Ticktum fell back at the start, but through the use of an alternative strategy, he got back to the lead pack and fought for the race win. When he overtook Oscar Piastri, the Australian collided with him and spun out; Ticktum, however, managed to keep going. He overtook Richard Verschoor on the penultimate lap and finished the race in second, only half a second behind Guanyu Zhou. At the next round Ticktum qualified fourth and finished sixth in the first sprint race in Monaco, and after jumping Théo Pourchaire at the start and overtaking Oscar Piastri into the nouvelle chicane in sprint race two, he ended up second, just behind Liam Lawson. After the race Lawson was disqualified for using an illegal throttle map on the formation lap, which promoted Ticktum to take his first win of the season. In the feature race he battled his rival Piastri for a podium spot, but Ticktum was forced to retire when he got stuck at La Rascasse, after an attempted overtake on the Australian. Following the race Ticktum took the blame for the incident and apologised to his team.

He was able to turn around his favours immediately, finishing second in the first Baku sprint race, having overtaken four drivers in the first half of the race. In the second sprint race of the weekend, Ticktum fell back to the back of the pack after being clipped by Zhou, but charged through the field after a safety car period to take sixth place. The feature race held similar fortunes: after a first-lap collision with Pourchaire and Marcus Armstrong, which led to Ticktum having to pit for repairs, he fought back, moving up to eighth and setting the fastest lap of the race. At the next event, his home race at Silverstone, Ticktum qualified fourth having topped practice. Ticktum finished on the podium in both the second sprint and the feature race, scoring more points that weekend than any other driver bar championship leader Oscar Piastri, and was also the only driver to score two podiums that weekend.

After the summer break Ticktum qualified in eighth, and was taken out in a collision with Felipe Drugovich in the first race in Monza. and despite eleven overtakes in the second sprint he was unable to get into the points-paying positions. Ticktum then started the feature race from eighth on the grid, being the first driver to line up with harder tyres at the start. After gaining the lead through a safety car period in the middle of the race, a well-timed safety car played into Ticktum's strategy, as he was able to come out of the pits in eleventh on fresher and softer rubber than his competitors with a few laps to go. Having shown supreme car control after being hit from behind at the restart, the Brit charged through the field, and finished third after another safety car  on the penultimate lap all but destroyed his chances for a victory. Ticktum scored his second win of the season in mixed conditions at the following round in Sochi, having led the sprint race from start to finish. Despite his victory, Ticktum said in a post-race interview that the win "[didn't] mean much" due to him "not going to be in Formula 1", which had always been his career goal. He finished fifth in the feature race that weekend, having started tenth.

In the penultimate qualifying session of the year in Jeddah Ticktum's car received a slow puncture with just a few minutes of the session left, which didn't allow him to improve his laptime and led to him qualifying in 13th place. During the first sprint race the Briton moved through the pack to finish seventh, and he started and finished race 2 in fourth. Ticktum finished 10th in the feature race on Sunday, thus ending his podium streak of six consecutive rounds of getting at least one podium. Ticktum had an uneventful weekend in the final round at the Yas Marina Circuit, but finished in the top six in all three races. Ticktum ended up fourth in the driverss' standings with two wins and seven podiums in total and a 159.5 points, 23.5 points behind third-placed Zhou.

Formula One

Red Bull (2017–2019) 
In January 2017, Ticktum was announced as a member of the Red Bull Junior Team. Ticktum was unable to take part in July 2018 in-season test due to insufficient superlicence points, with Red Bull stating it was "odd". It was also speculated that Ticktum would replace Brendon Hartley at Toro Rosso for the 2019 Formula One season, but it was given to Daniil Kvyat. However, Ticktum was scolded by Red Bull after he questioned Mick Schumacher's recent dominance in the 2018 FIA Formula 3 European Championship. Ticktum drove an F1 car for the first time at Silverstone, driving the McLaren MP4-28, as his reward of winning the 2017 Autosport BRDC Award.

At the start of 2019, he was able to test the Red Bull RB15 at the young drivers' tests in Bahrain and Barcelona, and took part in a number of simulator sessions at the team's base in Milton Keynes. Red Bull and Ticktum parted ways in mid-2019. Despite him questioning whether Red Bull had given him enough time in Super Formula, Ticktum stated that there was "no disrespect" towards academy boss Helmut Marko, and thanked him for "having given [him] the money to go racing".

Williams (2020–2021) 
Ticktum was named in the line-up of the Williams Driver Academy in December 2019, where he was designated the role of a development driver. He was retained for the 2021 season. In August 2021, shortly after Ticktum caused controversy by criticising and appearing to jibe Williams driver Nicholas Latifi, it was confirmed that he had been released from his contract.

Formula E

NIO 333 FE Team (2022–)

2021–22 season 

On 25 November 2021 the NIO 333 FE Team announced that Ticktum would be joining Oliver Turvey for the 2021–22 Formula E season. He stated that he was "looking forward to [racing in Formula E], as it's a totally different experience to Formula 2". In his debut race at the Diriyah ePrix, Ticktum beat his teammate and fellow rookie Antonio Giovinazzi to finish 18th. The following day Ticktum qualified in 18th place, but dropped back to 20th by the checkered flag. Ticktum's next race, the Mexico City ePrix, was compromised by a collision with Giovinazzi, which led to another 18th-place finish. Another point-less race in Rome followed, before Ticktum scored his first ever point in Formula E in the second race of the weekend, benefitting from a post-race penalty for Oliver Askew.

At the following round in Monaco, Ticktum beat his teammate Turvey, finishing twelfth, however a weekend in Berlin, which the Brit described as "pretty disastrous", ended with finishes near the back of the pecking order. An additional lowly finish at Jakarta was followed by Ticktum's first retirement of the season at the Marrakesh ePrix. Round 11 at New York City brought a 17th place, although a rapid start and a number of overtakes during Sunday's race enabled Ticktum to finish twelfth. He later described that drive as having been "the performance of [his] life". At his home race in London, a crash in practice hampered his chances, whilst an unsighted collision with Sam Bird meant retirement from Race 2.

The final round of the season in Seoul started out in a positive manner, with Ticktum qualifying in a season-best 13th for Race 1. However, the Brit was involved in a major pile-up on the first lap of a wet race after being hit by Sébastien Buemi, which forced him, alongside five other drivers including teammate Turvey, to retire. In the final qualifying session of the year, Ticktum made it into the duel phase for the first time, starting from seventh on the grid. After a tumultuous start, in which his car was slightly pushed into the wall by Lucas di Grassi, Ticktum ended the first lap sat in sixth place. However, hitting the wall going into the stadium section bent the steering of his car, forcing Ticktum to retire. He finished the season 21st in the standings, helping NIO 333 to not finish last for the first time in three seasons.

Prior to the final weekend of the season, Ticktum remarked that the team had "made massive leaps forward this year" and marked out their gains in qualifying pace as the team's biggest improvement throughout the season. He summed up his season as having been "challenging with lots to learn", whilst also stating that, considering his lack of experience, he was "pretty happy" with being on par with his teammate Turvey over the course of the season.

2022–23 season 
Having tested the new Gen3 era car after the conclusion of the 2022 season, Ticktum was announced to continue his relationship with NIO into 2023 alongside a new teammate, ex-Formula 2 driver Sérgio Sette Câmara who replaces Oliver Turvey. The season opener in Mexico City began with promise, as Ticktum managed to qualify second in his group, thus progressing to the quarter finals of the session, where he eventually lost out to Jake Hughes, giving him a starting spot of fifth, a personal best and his team's first top-five qualifying since Tom Blomqvist at the 2021 Berlin ePrix. During the race however, a drive-through penalty for his car going over the power limit sent the Briton to the back of the field, where two further penalties for cutting the chicane left him in 17th by the checkered flag.

At the second round in Diriyah, Ticktum managed to improve his best starting position, qualifying fourth, having missed out on a place in the final stage of the duels courtesy of a mistake in the final corner of the semi-final. The Briton fell back during the race, citing energy management issues of the car to have been the reason for a 14th-placed finish. Despite only qualifying in eleventh for the second round in Saudi Arabia, Ticktum managed to finish tenth, scoring his first point of the season. Recapitulating on the weekend, Ticktum stated he had performed "as good as [he] could have done", with him admitting that the team struggled with battery efficiency throughout the event. At the Hyderabad ePrix two weeks later, a technical issue forced Ticktum out of the race near the halfway mark. He would come back to points-scoring ways in Cape Town, finishing sixth after having started from eighth place.

Personal life 
Ticktum has gained a following of over twelve thousand followers on streaming-platform Twitch, where he plays Call of Duty.

He is well-known for his outspoken, blunt and occasionally discourteous nature, which mostly stands out in interviews and team radio messages and has earned him a controversial reputation.

Karting record

Karting career summary

Complete CIK-FIA Karting European Championship results 
(key) (Races in bold indicate pole position) (Races in italics indicate fastest lap)

Complete Karting World Championship results

Racing record

Racing career summary 

† As Ticktum was a guest driver, he was ineligible for points.

Complete MSA Formula results 
(key) (Races in bold indicate pole position; races in italics indicate fastest lap)

Complete Formula Renault Northern European Cup results 
(key) (Races in bold indicate pole position) (Races in italics indicate fastest lap)

† As Ticktum was a guest driver, he was ineligible for points.

Complete Formula Renault Eurocup results 
(key) (Races in bold indicate pole position; races in italics indicate fastest lap)

† As Ticktum was a guest driver, he was ineligible for points.

Complete FIA Formula 3 European Championship results 
(key) (Races in bold indicate pole position; races in italics indicate fastest lap)

† Driver did not finish the race, but was classified as he completed over 90% of the race distance.
* As Ticktum was a guest driver, he was ineligible for points.
‡ Half points awarded as less than 75% of race distance was completed.

Complete Macau Grand Prix results

Complete MRF Challenge Formula 2000 Championship results 
(key) (Races in bold indicate pole position; races in italics indicate fastest lap)

Complete GP3 Series results 
(key) (Races in bold indicate pole position; races in italics indicate fastest lap)

Complete Super Formula results
(key) (Races in bold indicate pole position; races in italics indicate fastest lap)

Complete FIA Formula 2 Championship results 
(key) (Races in bold indicate pole position points) (Races in italics indicate points for the fastest lap of top ten finishers)

‡ Half points awarded as less than 75% of race distance was completed.

Complete Formula Regional European Championship results 
(key) (Races in bold indicate pole position; races in italics indicate fastest lap)

Complete Formula E results
(key) (Races in bold indicate pole position; races in italics indicate fastest lap)

References

External links

1999 births
Living people
Sportspeople from London
English racing drivers
Formula Renault 2.0 NEC drivers
Formula Renault Eurocup drivers
British F4 Championship drivers
FIA Formula 3 European Championship drivers
MRF Challenge Formula 2000 Championship drivers
GP3 Series drivers
Super Formula drivers
FIA Formula 2 Championship drivers
Formula Regional European Championship drivers
F3 Asian Championship drivers
Koiranen GP drivers
Carlin racing drivers
Double R Racing drivers
Arden International drivers
DAMS drivers
Motopark Academy drivers
Mugen Motorsports drivers
Hitech Grand Prix drivers
Formula E drivers
NIO 333 FE Team drivers
Van Amersfoort Racing drivers
BRDC British Formula 3 Championship drivers
Karting World Championship drivers
Fortec Motorsport drivers